McKelvey Foundation is a charitable organization based in New York City, established in 2000 by American businessman and Monster Worldwide Inc. founder Andrew McKelvey. It has awarded college scholarships to more than 600 young students.

References

External links
McKelvey Foundation

Educational foundations in the United States
Organizations based in New York City
Scholarships in the United States